The Royal Mines Act 1424 was an act of the Parliament of Scotland (1424 c. 12) stating that  gold and silver mines containing ore above a certain value would belong to the king.

This made such mines inter regalia under Scots law (that is, property belonging to the sovereign), and by the phrasing of the act lead mines were also included when the ore from those mines produced the requisite amount of silver.

The effects of this act were negated by the Mines and Metals Act 1592 (1592 c. 31), which dissolved mines from the sovereign but did not change their status as inter regalia.

The act in its entirety is as follows:

or in modern English:

The act was passed by the Parliament at Perth on 26 May 1424 in the reign of James I, and was titled "Of mynis of golde and silver".

See also 
 Leadhills

References 

1420s in law
1424 in Scotland
Acts of the Parliament of Scotland
Mining in Scotland
Economy of Scotland in the Middle Ages
Medieval Scots law
Scottish monarchy